Taggart Siegel is an American documentary filmmaker. For 30 years, he has produced and directed Emmy-nominated, award-winning documentaries and dramas that reflect cultural diversity.  He is co-founder of Collective Eye Films, a nonprofit media production and distribution organization.

Films
The Real Dirt on Farmer John (2005) has won 31 international film festival awards, including the 2005 Nashville Film Festival Reel Current Award selected by Al Gore.  The film was featured on Independent Lens.

The Disenchanted Forest (1999) follows endangered orphan orangutans on the island of Borneo as they are rehabilitated and returned to their rainforest home. It centres on the three main Borneo Orangutan Survival Foundation (BOS) projects - Wanariset, Nyaru Menteng and Mawas. It is narrated by Brooke Shields.

The Split Horn: Life of a Hmong Shaman in America and Between Two Worlds follow the story of Hmong people adapting to life in America. Both films have aired on Public Broadcasting Corporation. Between Two Worlds was nominated for an Emmy Award in 2004.

Filmography

Documentaries

Fictional Work

References

External links 

Collective Eye
Real Dirt on Farmer John Filmmaker Q&A with Independent Lens
Queen of the Sun review
 Seed; The Untold Story official site

Living people
American documentary film directors
Year of birth missing (living people)